Dorymyrmex flavus is a species of ant in the genus Dorymyrmex. Described by McCook in 1879, the species is endemic to the United States and Mexico.

Etymology
Flavus is the Latin word for yellow, and describes the golden-yellow color of the ant.

References

Dorymyrmex
Hymenoptera of North America
Insects described in 1879